The 2014–15 Armenian First League season began on 5 August 2014 and finished on 3 June 2015.

League table

See also
 2014–15 Armenian Premier League
 2014–15 Armenian Cup

References

Armenian First League seasons
2014–15 in Armenian football
Armenia